EP 2 is the second extended play by American rapper and singer Qveen Herby, released by Checkbook Records on December 1, 2017. It serves as the follow-up to her first extended play, EP 1 (2017), which garnered positive reviews.

Background 
Qveen Herby released her debut EP, EP 1 on June 2, 2017, supported by the single "Busta Rhymes" as well as its music video. Following the conclusion of the EP's promotion, Herby began work on EP 2, working with Nick Noonan and Steve Tirogene for the album's production. The album contains guest appearances from American singers and rappers, Monogem and Maliibu Miitch. She additionally launched her cosmetics business Qveen Studios with DJ Audrey Napoleon, with the makeup line inspired by songs on the EP. The second single of the EP, Wifey, was also used in American crime drama and thriller series, Ozark, season 2 episode 9.

Singles 
EP 2 has been supported by the release of three singles. "Love Myself" was released as the lead single from the EP on September 8, 2017. It was accompanied by a music video the same day, but later on deleted. The second single, "Wifey", was released on October 13, 2017 with a music video. "Holiday" received a music video on November 30, 2017, directed by Benjamin Farren. It was released as the third single on December 1, 2017. Later on, the music video was deleted for an unknown reason.

Track listing

Release history

References 

2017 EPs
Qveen Herby albums
Self-released EPs
Hip hop EPs